Zahoor Ahmad Mir (born 24 February 1972) is an Indian politician, social activist and the former member of Jammu and Kashmir Legislative Assembly. He represented Pampore assembly constituency of Pulwama district thrice in 2003, 2008 and 2014 until PDP-BJP alliance ended in 2018.

A member of Jammu and Kashmir Peoples Democratic Party, he was appointed as the state minister for Forests, Environment and Ecology. He also served minister for Animal & Sheep Husbandry minister and Cooperative and Fisheries.

Biography 
He was born on 24 February 1972 to Abdul Aziz Mir in Konibal area of Jammu and Kashmir. He did his secondary education from the Jammu and Kashmir State Board of School Education in 1994.

In 2007, he was awarded the Certificate of Excellence and Rashtriya Gaurav Award in recognition of his contribution to the Economic Growth and National Integration. He was presented the awards by Bhishma Narain Singh, former governor of Assam and Tamil Nadu during a seminar Economic Growth and National Integration held in New Delhi. He also became the recipient of Adarsh Yuva Vidhayak Puraskar presented by Indian Student Parliament in recognition of his contribution to promote parliamentary system.

References 

1972 births
Living people
Jammu and Kashmir Peoples Democratic Party politicians
People from Pulwama
Jammu and Kashmir MLAs 2002–2008
Jammu and Kashmir MLAs 2008–2014
Jammu and Kashmir MLAs 2014–2018